Prince Khajera Chirapradidha or Phra Chao Boromwongse Ther Phra Ong Chao Khajera Chirapradidha (RTGS: Khajen Chirapradit) (23 July 1888 – 7 October 1888), was the Prince of Siam (later Thailand). He was a member of the Siamese Royal Family. He was a son of Chulalongkorn, King Rama V of Siam.

His mother was Sae Rojanadis, daughter of Phraya Abbhantrikamas and Bang Rojanadis. He had 2 younger sisters;
 Princess Abbhantripaja (31 October 1889 – 18 February 1934)
 Princess Dibyalangkarn (17 January 1891 – 4 June 1932)

Prince Khajera Chirapradidha died in babyhood on 7 October 1888, at the age of only 3 months.

Ancestry

1888 births
1888 deaths
19th-century Thai royalty who died as children
19th-century Chakri dynasty
Thai male Phra Ong Chao
Children of Chulalongkorn
Sons of kings